Kévin Goba (born 6 July 1987) is a French professional footballer who plays as a striker for the Championnat National 3 club AG Caennaise.

Professional career
Goba spent the majority of his playing career in the lower divisions of France, with ES Uzès Pont du Gard, and Cherbourg, before transferring to Dunkerque - a club his father also played at. He thereafter had a successful move to CS Sedan Ardennes, and then moved to LB Châteauroux whom he helped promote to the professional Ligue 2. Goba made his professional debut with in a 1–0 Coupe de la Ligue loss to Clermont Foot on 8 August 2017.

Personal life
Goba is the son of the Ivorian footballer Michel Goba, and the cousin of the Ivorian footballer, Didier Drogba.

References

External links
 
 
 
 Sofoot Profile

1987 births
Living people
People from Saint-Pol-sur-Mer
Sportspeople from Nord (French department)
Association football forwards
French footballers
French sportspeople of Ivorian descent
LB Châteauroux players
CS Sedan Ardennes players
USL Dunkerque players
AS Cherbourg Football players
ES Uzès Pont du Gard players
US Saint-Malo players
Ligue 2 players
Championnat National players
Championnat National 2 players
Championnat National 3 players
Footballers from Hauts-de-France